Guna Assembly constituency is one of the 230 Vidhan Sabha (Legislative Assembly) constituencies of Madhya Pradesh state in central India. This constituency is reserved for the candidates belonging to the Scheduled castes since 2008, following the delimitation of the Legislative Assembly constituencies. It came into existence in 1951, as one of the 79 Vidhan Sabha constituencies of the erstwhile Madhya Bharat state.

Overview
Guna (constituency number 29) is one of the 4 Vidhan Sabha constituencies located in Guna district. This constituency presently covers parts of Guna and Aron tehsils of the district.

Guna is part of Guna Lok Sabha constituency along with seven other Vidhan Sabha segments, namely, Bamori in this district, Shivpuri, Pichhore and Kolaras in Shivpuri district and Ashok Nagar, Chanderi and Mungaoli in Ashoknagar district.

Members of Legislative Assembly
As a constituency of Madhya Bharat:
 1951: Sitaram Tatke, Indian National Congress
As a constituency of Madhya Pradesh:
 1957: Daulat Ram, Indian National Congress
 1962: Brindawan Prasad, Hindu Mahasabha
 1967: R. L. Premi, Swatantra Party
 1972: Shiv Pratap Singh, Bharatiya Jana Sangh
 1977: Dharamswarup Saxena, Janata Party
 1980: Shiv Pratap Singh, Indian National Congress (I)
 1985: Shiv Pratap Singh, Indian National Congress
 1990: Bhag Chandra Sogani, Bharatiya Janata Party
 1993: Shiv Pratap Singh, Indian National Congress
 1998: Shiv Pratap Singh, Indian National Congress
 2003: Kanhaiyalal Rameshwar Agarwal, Bharatiya Janata Party
 2008: Rajendra Singh Saluja, Bharatiya Janshakti Party
 2013: Panna Lal Shakya, Bharatiya Janata Party

See also
 Guna

References

Guna district
Assembly constituencies of Madhya Pradesh